St. Peter's Church, Old St. Peter's Church, or other variations may refer to:

 St. Peter's Basilica in Rome

Australia
 St Peter's, Eastern Hill, Melbourne, Victoria, Australia
 St Peters Church, St Peters, Sydney, New South Wales, Australia

Austria
 Peterskirche, Vienna

Belgium
 St. Peter's Church, Leuven
 St. Peter's Church, Melreux

Bermuda
 St. Peter's Church, St. George's

Canada
 St. Peter's Lutheran Church, Ottawa
 St. Peter's Church, Toronto

China
 Saint Peter's Church, Shanghai

Denmark
 St. Peter's Church, Bornholm
 St. Peter's Church, Copenhagen
 St. Peter's Church, Næstved, Zealand
 Saint Peter's Church, Slagelse

Finland
 St. Peter's Church (Siuntio)

France
 St Peter's Church, Le Crotoy, Picardy
 St Peter's Church, Liverdun, Lorraine
 Old Saint Peter's Church, Strasbourg
 Saint-Pierre-le-Jeune Catholic Church, Strasbourg
 Saint-Pierre-le-Jeune Protestant Church, Strasbourg

Germany
 St. Peter am Perlach, Augsburg
 St Peter's Church (Cologne)
 St. Peter, Syburg, Dortmund-Syburg
 Saint Peter's Church, Fritzlar
 St. Peter's Church, Hamburg
 Peterskirche, Leipzig
 St. Peter's Church, Mainz,
 St. Peter's Church, Munich
 St. Peter's Church, Rostock
 St. Peter's Church, Straubing
 St Peter's Dom, Worms

Iceland
 St. Peter's Church, Akureyri, Norduland Eystra

India
 St. Peter's Church, Royapuram, Chennai, Tamil Nadu

Iran
 Saint Peter Church, Tehran

Ireland
 St. Peter's Church, Aungier Street, Dublin
 St Peter's Church, Phibsborough, Dublin
 St. Peter's Church, Ennisnag, Kilkenny
 St. Peter's Church, Laragh, Co.Monaghan.
 St. Peter's Roman Catholic Church, Drogheda, County Louth

Israel
 St. Peter's Church, Capernaum
 St. Peter's Church, Jaffa
 St. Peter's Church, Tiberias

Italy
 Church of St. Peter (Portovenere)
 Old St. Peter's Basilica

Kosovo 
 St. Peter's Basilica Church, Stari Trg

Latvia
 St. Peter's Church, Riga

Malaysia
 St. Peter's Church (Melaka)

Malta
 St Peter's Church and Monastery, Mdina
 St Peter's Chapel, Qormi

Netherlands
 St. Peter's Church, Leiden
 Protestant church of Jistrum or St. Peter's Church
 St. Peter's Church, Utrecht

New Zealand
 St Peter's Church, Riccarton, in Upper Riccarton, Christchurch, New Zealand

Norway
 St. Peter's Church, Halden

Pakistan
 St. Peter's Church, Karachi

Peru
 St. Peter's Church, Lima

Philippines
 Archdiocesan Shrine of Saints Peter and Paul, Bantayan, Cebu
 Saints Peter and Paul Parish, Ormoc, Leyte
 Saints Peter and Paul Parish, Makati
 Saints Peter and Paul Parish Church (Siniloan)
 Loboc Church (San Pedro Apostol Parish Church), Loboc, Bohol

Russia
 Lutheran Church of Saint Peter and Saint Paul, St. Petersburg

Serbia
St. Peter's Church, Ras

Singapore
 Church of Saints Peter and Paul, Singapore

Slovenia
 St. Peter's Church, Ljubljana

Spain
 Church of San Pedro Apóstol (Vitoria)
 Church of St Peter ad Vincula, Madrid
 San Pedro el Real, Madrid
 Iglesia de San Pedro, Teruel
 St. Peter's Church, Valdunquillo, Valladolid

Sri Lanka
 St. Peter's Church, Colombo

Sweden
 St. Peter's Church, Malmö
 St. Peter's Church, Stockholm

Switzerland
 St. Peter, Zürich

Turkey
 Church of Saint Peter, Antioch

United Kingdom

England

Bedfordshire 
 St Peter's Church, Bedford

Berkshire 
 St Peter's Church, Caversham

Bristol 
 St Peter's Church, Bishopsworth
 St Peter's Church, Castle Park, Bristol

Buckinghamshire 
 St Peter's Church, Burnham, Buckinghamshire

Cambridgeshire 
 St Peter's Church, Cambridge
 St Peter's Church, Duxford
 St Peter's Church, Offord D'Arcy
 St Peter-in-Ely
 St Peter's Church, Prickwillow
 St Peter's Church, Wisbech

Cheshire 
 St Peter's Church, Aston-by-Sutton
 St Peter's Church, Chester
 St Peter's Church, Congleton
 St Peter's Church, Crewe
 St Peter's Church, Delamere
 St Peter's Church, Hargrave
 St Peter's Church, Little Budworth
 St Peter's Church, Macclesfield,
 St Peter's Church, Minshull Vernon
 St Peter's Church, Oughtrington
 St Peter's Church, Plemstall
 St Peter's Church, Prestbury
 St Peter's Church, Swettenham
 St Peter's Church, Tabley,
 St Peter's Church, Waverton

Cumbria 
 St Peter's Church, Camerton
 St Peter's Church, Field Broughton
 St Peter's Church, Finsthwaite
 St Peter's Church, Heversham
 St Peter's Church, Kirkbampton
 St Peter's Church, Mansergh
 St Peter's Church, Martindale

Derbyshire 
 St Peter's Church, Belper
 St Peter's Church, Derby
 St Peter's Church, Edensor
 St Peter's Church, Hope
 St Peter's Church, Netherseal
 St Peter's Church, Parwich,
 St Peter's Church, Snelston
 St Peter's Church, Stonebroom

Devon 
 St Peter's Church, Barnstaple
 St Peter's Church, Rose Ash, by architect James Piers St Aubyn
 St Peter's Church, Tiverton

Dorset 
 St Peter's Church, Bournemouth
 St Peter's Church, Portesham
 St Peter's Church, Winterborne Came

County Durham 
 St Peter's Church, Bishopton
 St Peter's Church, Redcar
 St Peter's Church, Stockton-on-Tees

East Sussex 
 St Peter's Church, Aldrington
 St Peter's Church, Brighton
 St Peter's Church, Preston Village, Brighton
 St Peter's Church, St Leonards-on-Sea
 St Peter's Church, West Blatchington
 St Mary and St Peter's Church, Wilmington
 St Peter's Church, Rodmell

Essex 
 Church of St Peter-on-the-Wall, Bradwell-on-Sea
 St Peter's Church, Roydon
 St Peter's Church, Wickham Bishops

Gloucestershire 
 St Peter's Church, Gloucester
 St Peter's Church, Leckhampton
 St Peter's Church, Southrop

Greater Manchester 
 St Peter's Church, Ashton-under-Lyne
 St Peter's Church, Bolton
 St Peter's Church, Hindley
 St Peter's Church, Stockport
 St Peter's Church, Westleigh, Greater Manchester

Hampshire 
 St Peter's Church, Petersfield
 St Peter's Church, Titchfield
 St Peter's Church, Chesil, Winchester
 St Peter's Church, Winchester

Hertfordshire 
 Church of St Peter, Great Berkhamsted
 St. Peter's Church, St. Albans

Isle of Wight 
 St Peter's Church, Havenstreet
 St Peter's Church, Seaview
 St Peter's Church, Shorwell

Kent 
 St Peter's Church, Boughton Monchelsea
 St Peter's Church, Maidstone
 St Peter's Church, Sandwich
 St Peter's Church, Swingfield

Lancashire 
 St Peter's Church, Burnley
 St Peter's Church, Darwen
 St Peter's Church, Fleetwood
 St Peter's Church, Heysham
 St Peter's Church, Leck
 St Peter's Church, Mawdesley
 St Peter's Church, Preston, Lancashire
 St Peter's Church, Scorton

Leicestershire 
 St Peter's Church, Allexton
 St Peter's Church, Leicester

Lincolnshire 
 St Peter's Church, Barton-upon-Humber
 St Peter's Church, Kingerby
 St Peter's Church, Normanby by Spital
 St Peter's Church, Ropsley
 St Peter's Church, Saltfleetby
 St Peter's Church, South Somercotes

London 
 St Peter's Church, Arkley
 St Peter's Church, Belsize Park, by architect James Piers St Aubyn
 St Peter's, Bethnal Green
 St Peter's Church, Ealing
 St Peter's Church, Eaton Square
 St Peter's Church, Hammersmith
 St Peter's, London Docks
 St Peter's Church, Petersham
 St Peter's Church, Streatham
 St Peter's Church, Upton Cross
 St Peter's Church, Vauxhall
 St Peter's Church, Walworth
 Westminster Abbey or The Collegiate Church of St Peter
 St Peter's Italian Church
 St Peter upon Cornhill
 St Peter-in-the-Forest

Merseyside 
 St Peter's Church, Birkdale
 St Peter's Church, Formby
 St Peter's Church, Heswall
 St Peter's Roman Catholic Church, Liverpool
 St Peter's Church, Liverpool
 St Peter's Church, Parr
 St Peter's Church, Rock Ferry
 St Peter's Church, Woolton, Liverpool

Norfolk 
 St Peter's Church, Hockwold
 Saint Peter’s Church, North Barningham

North Yorkshire 
 Church of St Peter, Croft-on-Tees
 St Peter's Church, Harrogate
 St Peter's Church, Redcar
 St Peter's Church, Rylstone
 St Peter's Church, Scarborough
 St Peter's Church, Stainforth
 St Peter's Church, Walpole St Peter
 St Peter's Church, Wintringham

Northamptonshire 
 St Peter's Church, Deene
 St Peter's Church, Lowick
 St Peter's Church, Northampton
 St Peter's Church, Raunds

Nottinghamshire 
 St Peter's Church, Clayworth
 St Peter's Church, East Bridgford
 St Peter's Church, Farndon
 St Peter's Church, Flawford
 St Peter's Church, Gamston
 St Peter's Church, Hayton
 St Peter's Church, Headon-cum-Upton
 St Peter's Church, Laneham
 St Peter's Church, Nottingham
 St Peter's Church, Radford
 St Peter's Church, Ruddington

Oxfordshire 
 St Peter-in-the-East, Oxford
 St Peter's Church, Wallingford

Shropshire 
 St Peter's Church, Adderley
 St Peter's Church, Chelmarsh
 St Peter's Church, Cound
 St Peter's Church, Edgmond

Somerset 
 St Peter's Church, Exton
 Church of St Peter, Marksbury
 St Peter's Church, Treborough

South Yorkshire 
 St Peter's Church, Barnburgh
 St Peter's Church, Letwell

Staffordshire 
 St Peter's Church, Alstonefield
 St Peter's Church, Elford
 St Peter's Church, Marchington
 Church of St Peter, Yoxall

Suffolk 
 St Peter's Church, Claydon
 St Peter's Church, Carlton Colville
 St Peter's Church, Henley
 St Peter's Church, Ipswich
 St Peter's Church, Sudbury

Surrey 
 St Peter's Church, Old Woking
 St Peter's Church, Wrecclesham

Tyne and Wear 
 St Peter's Church, Monkwearmouth 
 St Peter's Church, Wallsend

Warwickshire 
 St Peter's Church, Binton 
 St Peter's Church, Leamington Spa
 St Peter's Church, Wolfhampcote

West Midlands 
 St Peter's Roman Catholic Church, Bloxwich
 St Peter's Church, Dale End 
 St Peter's Church, Hall Green
 St Peter's Church, Handsworth 
 St Peter's Church, Harborne 
 St Peter's Church, Spring Hill 
St Peter's Church, Walsall
 St Peter's Collegiate Church, Wolverhampton

West Sussex 
 St Peter's Church, Ardingly
 St Peter's Church, Selsey
 St Peter's Church, Shoreham-by-Sea
 St Peter's Church, Twineham

West Yorkshire 
 Leeds Minster, Minster and Parish Church of Saint Peter-at-Leeds
 St Peter's Church, Addingham
 St Peter's Church, Birstall
 St Peter's Church, Huddersfield
 St Peter's Church, Thorner
 St Peter's Church, Walton, Leeds

Wiltshire 
 Church of St Peter, Clyffe Pypard
 St Peter's Church, Devizes
 St Peter's Church, Everleigh

Wales
 Old St. Peter's Church, Llanbedr Dyffryn Clwyd, North Wales
 St Peter's Church, Llanbedr Dyffryn Clwyd, Denbighshire
 St Peter's Church, Bryngwyn, Monmouthshire, Wales
 St Peter's Church, Carmarthen, South Wales
 St Peter's Church, Dixton
 St Peter's Church, Llanbedrgoch
 St Peter's Church, Newborough, Anglesey
 St Peter's Church, Pentre, South Wales
 St Peter's Church, Peterston-super-Ely, Vale of Glamorgan
 Collegiate and Parochial Church of St Peter, Ruthin, North Wales
 St Peter's Church, Wentlooge

Scotland
 St Peter's Church, Aberdeen
 St Peter's Church, Edinburgh
 Old St Peter's Church, Peterhead
 St Peter's Church, Sandwick, Orkney
 Old St Peter's Church, Thurso

Northern Ireland
 St Peter's Church, Belfast

United States
 St. Peter's Church (Sitka, Alaska)
 St. Peter Church (Bridgeport, Connecticut)
 Church of St. Peter (Danbury, Connecticut)
 St. Peter's Church (Washington, D.C.)
St. Peter's in the Loop, Chicago, Illinois
 St. Peters United Evangelical Lutheran Church, Ceres, Iowa
 St. Peter's Catholic Church (Council Bluffs, Iowa)
 St. Peter Church (Keokuk, Iowa)
 Cathedral of Saint Peter (Kansas City, Kansas)
 St. Peter's AME Church, Harrodsburg, Kentucky
 St. Peter's Church (Queenstown, Maryland)
 St. Peters Catholic Church (Worcester, Massachusetts)
 Saint Peter's Church (Mendota, Minnesota)
 St. Peter's Church (Kansas City, Missouri)
 St. Peter's Catholic Church (Rensselaer, Missouri)
 Saint Peters Churchyard, Perth Amboy, New Jersey
 Saint Peter’s Roman Catholic Church, Belleville, New Jersey
 St. Peters Church and Buildings, Spotswood, New Jersey
 St. Peter's Church (Albany, New York)
 St. Peter's Church, Chapel and Cemetery Complex, The Bronx, New York
 St. Peter's Church (Hyde Park, New York)
 St. Peter's Church (Staten Island), New York
 St. Peter's Church (Manhattan), New York
 Evangelical Lutheran Church of St. Peter, Rhinebeck, New York
 St. Peter's Lutheran Church and School, Sanborn, New York
 St. Peter's Presbyterian Church, Spencertown, New York
 Old St. Peter's Church (Van Cortlandtville, New York)
 St. Peter-In-Chains Cathedral, Cincinnati, Ohio
 St. Peter Church (Cleveland, Ohio)
 St. Peter's Church (Mansfield, Ohio)
 St. Peter's Church (Brownsville, Pennsylvania)
 St. Peter's Kierch, Middletown, Pennsylvania
 St. Peter's Episcopal Church (Philadelphia), Pennsylvania
 St. Peter's Church in the Great Valley, Phoenixville, Pennsylvania
 St. Peter's Church and Mount St. Joseph Convent Complex, Rutland, Vermont
 St. Peter's Church (Talleysville, Virginia)
 St. Peter's Church (Richmond, Virginia)
 St. Peter's and St. Joseph's Catholic Churches, Oconto, Wisconsin
 St. Peter's Church (West Bend, Wisconsin)

See also
 St. Peter's (disambiguation)
 St. Peter's Basilica
 St. Peter's-By-The-Sea (disambiguation)
 St. Peter's Cathedral (disambiguation)
 St. Peter's Episcopal Church (disambiguation)
 St. Peter's Roman Catholic Church (disambiguation)